Bury the Lies is the second studio album by Swedish rock band Takida. The album debuted at number one on the Swedish Albums Chart and has sold platinum in the country, 40 000 copies. All in all the album has spent 90 weeks on the chart making it the 29th best-charting album on the chart of all times.

Track listing
"The Dread" 3:05
"Hole In the Ground" 4:18
"Feeble Pride" 3:29
"Tear It Up Again" 4:28
"Halo" 3:57
"Ashamed" 3:48
"Curly Sue" 3:53
"Bad Seed" 3:58
"Poisoned" 3:58
"Snypah" 4:05
"Handlake Village" 4:18

 
All songs composed by  Fredrik Pålsson, Kristoffer Söderström, Mattias Larsson, Patrik Frisk, Robert Pettersson & Tomas Wallin

Charts and certifications

Weekly charts

Year-end charts

Certifications

Release history

References 

Takida albums
2007 albums